Baybridge can refer to:

Baybridge, Hampshire
Baybridge, Northumberland
Baybridge Canal, Sussex

See also 
Bay Bridge (disambiguation)